"Green Tambourine" is a song written and composed by Paul Leka (who also produced it) and Shelley Pinz. It was the biggest hit by the 1960s Ohio-based rock group the Lemon Pipers, as well as the title track of their debut album, Green Tambourine. The song was one of the first psychedelic pop chart-toppers and became a gold record.

Released toward the end of 1967, it spent 13 weeks on the U.S. Billboard Hot 100, peaking at No. 1 on February 3, 1968, and sold over a million copies. The record remained on the chart for three months.<ref name="ROCK ON">Nite, Norm N. and Newman, Ralph M.: ROCK ON: The Illustrated Encyclopedia Of Rock N' Roll''': Thomas Y. Crowell: 1978. p 276.</ref>  It was also the first U.S. No. 1 hit for the Buddah label. The Lemon Pipers never repeated this success, though their "Rice Is Nice" and "Jelly Jungle", both also written by Leka and Pinz, made the charts in 1968.

Song and recording
The song's lyricist, Rochelle "Shelley" Pinz (1943–2004) was a writer at the Brill Building, working with Leka.  She said:

In early Spring, 1966, while standing in front of the Brill Building I watched a man holding a tambourine begging for money. I wrote a poem about him and called the poem 'Green Tambourine.' I added it to my lyric collection ... Sometimes I wonder what happened to the man in front of the Brill Building, holding a tambourine begging for money. I remember writing the lyric, 'watch the jingle jangle start to shine, reflections of the music that is mine. When you toss a coin you'll hear it sing. Now listen while I play my Green Tambourine' as if it were yesterday..; in the 60s, on the streets between Seventh Avenue and Broadway there was a magic one could only imagine.

The song tells the story of a street musician pleading for someone to give him money. In exchange he offers to play his green tambourine. The song's instrumentation contains the titular tambourine as well as an electric sitar, a frequent signature of the so-called "psychedelic sound".  Another hook is the heavy, psychedelic tape echo applied to the word "play" in each chorus and at the end, fading into a drumroll ("Listen while I play play play play play play play my green tambourine"). The echo is noticeably different in the mono and stereo mixes. The mono version also starts fading out slightly earlier than in the stereo version. The musical arrangement also features sweeping orchestrated strings and the distinctive vibraslap percussion instrument. While the Lemon Pipers played on the record, producer and joint author-composer Leka hired a string section to accompany the band, to add extra depth to the already psychedelic arrangement. The string section consisted of Elliot Rosoff, David Sackson, Irving Spice, Louise Stone, Louis Gaborwitz, and Deborah Idol on violins; Seymour Berman on viola; and Seymour Barab and Sally Rosoff on cellos.

The single's B-side, "No Help from Me," featured lead vocal by keyboardist Bob Nave and did not appear on either of the group's two albums.

Chart performance
Weekly charts

Year-end charts

Personnel
 Ivan Browne – lead vocals, rhythm guitar
 Bill Bartlett – lead guitar
 R. G. Nave – organ, tambourine, fog horn, toys
 Steve Walmsley – bass
 Bill Albaugh – drums

Additional personnel
Irv Spice Strings – string section
 Ken Hamann (incorrectly credited on original album pressings as "Kenny Hammond") – engineer (Cleveland Recording Company)
 Bill Radice – engineer (New York)

Cover versions
In 1968, an instrumental version was released by Lawrence Welk and His Orchestra on the album Love Is Blue, and as a single. Welk's version reached No. 27 on Billboards Easy Listening chart,"Billboard Top 40 Easy Listening", Billboard, April 6, 1968. p. 49. Accessed July 29, 2016. No. 21 on Record Worlds "Top Non-Rock" chart, and No. 11 on Record Worlds chart of "Singles Coming Up".

Mrs. Miller covered the song on her 1968 album Mrs. Miller Does Her Thing.The Status Quo covered the song on their 1968 debut album Picturesque Matchstickable Messages from the Status Quo.UK band Sun Dragon recorded a very similar version in 1968 for the MGM label.

The Peppermint Rainbow covered the song on their 1969 album Will You Be Staying After Sunday. Leka used the backing track of the Lemon Pipers' hit on this recording.

In 1990, the Associates released a cover version as the B-side of their "Fire to Ice" single.

Tripping Daisy covered the song on their 1992 debut album, Bill (The Dragon Street release).

Robert Goulet covered the song for the 2001 film Recess: School's Out, providing the singing voice for the character Mikey, releasing it as a single from the film soundtrack of the same name.

 In popular culture 

 The song was featured in a TV commercial for the Plymouth Road Runner in 1970.
 Actor Billy Bob Thornton's character of Lorne Malvo plays the song at the beginning of Episode 9, "A Fox, a Rabbit, and a Cabbage," of Fargo, adapted from the Coen Brothers' 1996 movie.
 The song is featured in the end credits of the Disney animated film Recess: School's Out'', sung by Robert Goulet.

See also
 List of 1960s one-hit wonders in the United States

References

External links
 Lyrics of this song
 

1967 singles
Status Quo (band) songs
Billboard Hot 100 number-one singles
Cashbox number-one singles
RPM Top Singles number-one singles
American psychedelic rock songs
Songs about music
Songs about musicians
Songs about musical instruments
Songs written by Paul Leka
1967 songs
Song recordings produced by Paul Leka
The Associates (band) songs
Bubblegum pop songs